The ICC Men's Test Team of the Year is an honour awarded each year by the International Cricket Council. It recognises the top cricket players from around the world in the Test format of the game. The team does not actually compete, but exists solely as an honorary entity.

ICC World Test XI

Winners
Players marked bold won the ICC Test Player of the Year in that respective year:

Superlatives
Players marked bold are still active in Test matches and years marked bold indicate they won the ICC Test Player of the Year in that respective year:

Appearances by nation

See also
 ICC Awards
 Sir Garfield Sobers Trophy (Men's Cricketer of the Year)
 ICC Men's Test Cricketer of the Year
 ICC Men's ODI Cricketer of the Year
 ICC Men's ODI Team of the Year
 David Shepherd Trophy (Umpire of the Year)
 ICC Women's Cricketer of the Year

References

International Cricket Council awards and rankings
Test cricketers
Lists of cricketers